Orioles are colourful Old World passerine birds in the genus Oriolus, the type genus of the corvoidean family Oriolidae. They are not closely related to the New World orioles, which are icterids (family Icteridae) that belong to the superfamily Passeroidea.

Taxonomy and systematics
The genus Oriolus was erected by Linnaeus in 1766 in the 12th edition of his Systema Naturae. The type species is the golden oriole (Oriolus oriolus).  In 1760, French ornithologist Mathurin Jacques Brisson in his Ornithologie used Oriolus as a subdivision of the genus Turdus, but the International Commission on Zoological Nomenclature ruled in 1955 that "Oriolus Brisson, 1760" should be suppressed. Linnaeus added more than a dozen additional genera when he updated his 10th edition, but he generally based new genera on those that had been introduced by Brisson in his Ornithologie. Oriolus is now the only genus for which Linnaeus's 12th edition is cited as the original publication. The name is derived from the old French word oriol, which is echoic in origin, derived from the call of the bird, but others have suggested origins in classical Latin aureolus meaning "golden". Various forms of "oriole" have existed in Romance languages since the 12th and 13th centuries.

Extant species

The genus contains 30 species:

Former species 
Formerly, some authorities also considered these species (or subspecies) as species within the genus Oriolus:
 Green figbird (as Oriolus viridis)
 Brown-eared bulbul (squamiceps) (as Oriolus squamiceps)

Distribution and habitat
The orioles are a mainly tropical group, although one species, the Eurasian golden oriole, breeds in temperate regions.

References

External links
 Orioles (Oriolidae) - videos, photos and sounds at the Internet Bird Collection

 
Bird genera